The Binoculars Building is the common name of Google's Venice campus in Los Angeles, California. Originally known as the Chiat/Day Building, it was built in 1991 for the advertising agency Chiat/Day (now TBWA\Chiat\Day) and designed by architect Frank Gehry. The building has a prominent public artwork entitled Giant Binoculars (1991), designed by artists Claes Oldenburg and Coosje van Bruggen, on its street-facing façade, hence the vernacular name.

The Giant Binoculars sculpture covers both a car and pedestrian entrance; the entrance to the parking garage is between the two telescopes of the binoculars. The  building was delayed for a few years after hazardous materials were found on the building site, requiring removal. The latest tenant of this building was Google in 2011, which added two neighboring buildings as part of a major expansion to establish a larger employment presence in Los Angeles. The campus became the center of a large COVID-19 outbreak in 2022.

References

External links

ArcSpace: Chiat/Day Building 1991

Frank Gehry buildings
Google real estate
Office buildings completed in 1991
Commercial buildings in Los Angeles
Landmarks in Los Angeles
Expressionist architecture
Postmodern architecture in California
Venice, Los Angeles
1991 establishments in California